The Great Dictator is a 1940 American anti-war political satire black comedy film written, directed, produced, scored by, and starring British comedian Charlie Chaplin, following the tradition of many of his other films. Having been the only Hollywood filmmaker to continue to make silent films well into the period of sound films, Chaplin made this his first true sound film.

Chaplin's film advanced a stirring condemnation of Adolf Hitler, Benito Mussolini, fascism, antisemitism, and the Nazis. At the time of its first release, the United States was still formally at peace with Nazi Germany and neutral during what were the early days of World War II. Chaplin plays both leading roles: a ruthless fascist dictator and a persecuted Jewish barber.

The Great Dictator was popular with audiences, becoming Chaplin's most commercially successful film. Modern critics have  praised it as a historically significant film, one of the greatest comedy films ever made and an important work of satire. Chaplin's climactic monologue has frequently been listed by critics, historians and film buffs as perhaps the greatest monologue in film history, and possibly the most poignant recorded speech of the 20th century. In 1997, it was selected by the Library of Congress for preservation in the United States National Film Registry as being "culturally, historically, or aesthetically significant". The Great Dictator was nominated for five Academy Awards – Outstanding Production, Best Actor, Best Writing (Original Screenplay), Best Supporting Actor for Jack Oakie, and Best Music (Original Score).

In his 1964 autobiography, Chaplin stated that he could not have made the film if he had known about the true extent of the horrors of the Nazi concentration camps at that time.

Plot

On the Western Front in 1918, a Jewish Private fighting for the Central Powers nation of Tomainia valiantly saves the life of a wounded pilot, Commander Schultz, who carries valuable documents that could secure a Tomainian victory. However, after running out of fuel, their plane crashes into a tree and the Private subsequently suffers memory loss. Upon being rescued, Schultz is informed that Tomainia has officially surrendered to the Allied Forces, while the Private is carried off to a hospital.

Twenty years later, still suffering from amnesia, the Private returns to his previous profession as a barber in a ghetto. The ghetto is now governed by Schultz who has been promoted in the Tomainian regime, which transformed into a fascist dictatorship under the ruthless Adenoid Hynkel.

The Barber falls in love with a neighbor, Hannah, and together they try to resist persecution by military forces. The storm troopers capture the Barber and are about to hang him, but Schultz recognizes him and restrains them. By recognizing him, and reminding him of World War I, Schultz helps the Barber regain his memory.

Meanwhile, Hynkel tries to finance his ever-growing military forces by borrowing money from a Jewish banker called Hermann Epstein, leading to a temporary ease on the restrictions on the ghetto. However, ultimately the banker refuses to lend him the money. Furious, Hynkel orders a purge of the Jews. Schultz protests against this inhumane policy and is sent to a concentration camp. He escapes and hides in the ghetto with the Barber. Schultz tries to persuade the Jewish family to assassinate Hynkel in a suicide attack, but they are dissuaded by Hannah. Troops search the ghetto, arrest Schultz and the Barber, and send both to a concentration camp. Hannah and her family flee to freedom at a vineyard in the neighboring country of Osterlich.

Hynkel has a dispute with the dictator of the nation of Bacteria, Benzino Napaloni, over which country should invade Osterlich. The two dictators argue over a treaty to govern the invasion, while dining together at an elaborate buffet, which happens to provide a jar of English mustard. The quarrel becomes heated and descends into a food fight, which is only resolved when both men eat the hot mustard and are shocked into cooperating. After signing the treaty with Napaloni, Hynkel orders the invasion of Osterlich. Hannah and her family are trapped by the invading force and beaten by a squad of arriving soldiers.

Escaping from the camp in stolen uniforms, Schultz and the Barber, dressed as Hynkel, arrive at the Osterlich frontier, where a victory parade crowd is waiting to be addressed by Hynkel. The real Hynkel is mistaken for the Barber while out duck hunting in civilian clothes and is knocked out and taken to the camp. Schultz tells the Barber to go to the platform and impersonate Hynkel, as the only way to save their lives once they reach Osterlich's capital. The Barber has never given a public speech in his life, but he has no other choice. He announces that he (as Hynkel) has had a change of heart, he makes an impassioned speech for brotherhood and goodwill, encouraging soldiers to fight for liberty, and unite the people in the name of democracy.

He then addresses a message of hope to Hannah: "Look up, Hannah. The soul of man has been given wings, and at last he is beginning to fly. He is flying into the rainbow, into the light of hope, into the future, the glorious future that belongs to you, to me, and to all of us." Hannah hears the Barber's voice on the radio. She turns toward the rising sunlight, and says to her fellows: "Listen."

Cast

People of the ghetto
 Charlie Chaplin as a Jewish barber in the ghetto, the main protagonist. The Barber was a soldier during World War I and loses his memory for about 20 years. After having rescued Schultz during the war, he meets his friend again under radically changed circumstances.
 Paulette Goddard as Hannah, the Barber's neighbor. She lives in the ghetto next to the barber shop. She supports the Barber against the Tomainian Storm troopers.
 Maurice Moscovich as Mr. Jaeckel, an elderly Jew who befriends Hannah. Mr. Jaeckel is the renter of the barber salon.
 Emma Dunn as Mrs. Jaeckel
 Bernard Gorcey as Mr. Mann
 Paul Weigel as Mr. Agar
 Chester Conklin as Barber's customer

People of the palace
 Charlie Chaplin as Adenoid Hynkel, the main antagonist. Hynkel is the dictator, or "Phooey", of Tomainia (a parody of Adolf Hitler, the Führer of Nazi Germany) and attacks the Jews with his storm troopers. He has Schultz arrested and has his storm troopers hunt down the Jewish Barber. Hynkel is later arrested by his own soldiers in the woods near the border, who mistake him for the Jewish Barber.
 Jack Oakie as Benzino Napaloni, the Diggaditchie of Bacteria (a parody of Benito Mussolini, Il Duce of Italy and a reference to French emperor Napoleon Bonaparte).
 Reginald Gardiner as Commander Schultz, a Tomainian who fought in World War I, who commands soldiers in the 1930s. He has his troops abstain from attacking Jews, but is arrested by Hynkel, after which he becomes a loyal ally to the Barber. He later leads the invasion of Osterlich and helps the Barber pretend to be Adenoid Hynkel in his (successful) attempt at saving Osterlich.
 Henry Daniell as Garbitsch, a parody of Joseph Goebbels, and Hynkel's loyal and stoic Secretary of the Interior and Minister of Propaganda.
 Billy Gilbert as Herring, a parody of Hermann Göring, and Hynkel's Minister of War. He supervises demonstrations of newly developed weapons, which tend to fail and annoy Hynkel.
 Grace Hayle as Madame Napaloni, the wife of Benzino who later dances with Hynkel. In Italy, scenes involving her were all cut out of respect to Benito Mussolini's widow Rachele until 2002.
 Carter DeHaven as Spook, the Bacterian ambassador.

Other cast
 Stanley "Tiny" Sandford as a comrade soldier in 1918
 Joe Bordeaux as ghetto extra
 Hank Mann as storm trooper stealing fruit
Also featuring Esther Michelson, Florence Wright, Eddie Gribbon, Robert O. Davis, Eddie Dunn, Nita Pike and Peter Lynn.

Production
According to Jürgen Trimborn's biography of Nazi propaganda filmmaker Leni Riefenstahl, both Chaplin and French filmmaker René Clair viewed Riefenstahl's Triumph of the Will together at a showing at the New York Museum of Modern Art. Filmmaker Luis Buñuel reports that Clair was horrified by the power of the film, crying out that this should never be shown or the West was lost. Chaplin, on the other hand, laughed uproariously at the film. He used it to inspire many elements of The Great Dictator, and, by repeatedly viewing this film, Chaplin could closely mimic Hitler's mannerisms.

Trimborn suggests that Chaplin decided to proceed with making The Great Dictator after viewing Riefenstahl's film. Hynkel's rally speech near the beginning of the film, delivered in German-sounding gibberish, is a caricature of Hitler's oratory style, which Chaplin also studied carefully in newsreels.

The film was directed by Chaplin (with his half-brother Wheeler Dryden as assistant director), and written and produced by Chaplin. The film was shot largely at the Charlie Chaplin Studios and other locations around Los Angeles. The elaborate World War I scenes were filmed in Laurel Canyon. Chaplin and Meredith Willson composed the music. Filming began in September 1939 (coincidentally soon after Germany invaded Poland, triggering World War II) and finished six months later.

Chaplin wanted to address the escalating violence and repression of Jews by the Nazis throughout the late 1930s, the magnitude of which was conveyed to him personally by his European Jewish friends and fellow artists. Nazi Germany's repressive nature and militarist tendencies were well known at the time. Ernst Lubitsch's 1942 To Be or Not To Be dealt with similar themes, and also used a mistaken-identity Hitler figure. But Chaplin later said that he would not have made the film had he known of the true extent of the Nazis' crimes. After the horror of the Holocaust became known, filmmakers struggled for nearly 20 years to find the right angle and tone to satirize the era.

In the period when Hitler and his Nazi Party rose to prominence, Chaplin was becoming internationally popular. He was mobbed by fans on a 1931 trip to Berlin, which annoyed the Nazis. Resenting his style of comedy, they published a book titled The Jews Are Looking at You (1934), describing the comedian as "a disgusting Jewish acrobat" (although Chaplin was not Jewish). Ivor Montagu, a close friend of Chaplin's, relates that he sent the comedian a copy of the book and always believed that Chaplin decided to retaliate with making Dictator.

In the 1930s, cartoonists and comedians often built on Hitler and Chaplin having similar mustaches. Chaplin also capitalized on this resemblance in order to give his Little Tramp character a "reprieve".

In his memoir My Father, Charlie Chaplin, Chaplin's son Charles Chaplin Jr. described his father as being haunted by the similarities in background between him and Hitler; they were born four days apart in April 1889, and both had risen to their present heights from poverty. He wrote:

Their destinies were poles apart. One was to make millions weep, while the other was to set the whole world laughing. Dad could never think of Hitler without a shudder, half of horror, half of fascination. "Just think", he would say uneasily, "he's the madman, I'm the comic. But it could have been the other way around."

Chaplin prepared the story throughout 1938 and 1939, and began filming in September 1939, six days after the beginning of World War II. He finished filming almost six months later. The 2002 TV documentary on the making of the film, The Tramp and the Dictator, presented newly discovered footage of the film production (shot by Chaplin's elder half-brother Sydney) that showed Chaplin's initial attempts at the film's ending, filmed before the fall of France.

According to The Tramp and the Dictator, Chaplin arranged to send the film to Hitler, and an eyewitness confirmed he saw it. Hitler's architect and friend Albert Speer denied that the leader had ever seen it. Hitler's response to the film is not recorded, but another account tells that he viewed the film twice.

Some of the signs in the shop windows of the ghetto in the film are written in Esperanto, a language that Hitler condemned as an anti-nationalist Jewish plot to destroy German culture because it was an international language whose founder was a Polish Jew.

Music
The film score was written and composed by Meredith Willson, later known as composer and librettist of the 1957 musical comedy The Music Man:

According to Willson, the scene in which Chaplin shaves a customer to Brahms' Hungarian Dance No. 5 had been filmed before he arrived, using a phonograph record for timing. Willson's task was to re-record it with the full studio orchestra, fitting the music to the action. They had planned to do it painstakingly, recording eight measures or less at a time, after running through the whole scene to get the overall idea. Chaplin decided to record the run-through in case anything was usable. Willson later wrote, "by dumb luck we had managed to catch every movement, and that was the first and only 'take' made of the scene, the one used in the finished picture".

James L. Neibaur has noted that among the many parallels that Chaplin noted between his own life and Hitler's was an affinity for Wagner's music. Chaplin's appreciation for Wagner has been noted in studies of the director's use of film music. Many commentators have noted Chaplin's use of Wagner's Lohengrin prelude when Hynkel dances with the globe-balloon. Chaplin repeated the use of the Lohengrin prelude near the conclusion when the exiled Hannah listens to the Jewish barber's speech celebrating democracy and freedom. The music is interrupted during the dictator's dance but it is heard to climax and completion in the barber's pro-democracy speech.

Commenting on this, Lutz Peter Koepnick writes in 2002,

Reception

Chaplin's film was released nine months after Hollywood's first parody of Hitler, the short subject You Nazty Spy! by the Three Stooges, which premiered in January 1940. Chaplin had been planning his feature-length work for years, and began filming in September 1939. Hitler had been previously allegorically pilloried in the 1933 German film The Testament of Dr. Mabuse, by Fritz Lang.

The film was well received in the United States at the time of its release, and was popular with the American public. For example, Bosley Crowther of The New York Times called the film "a truly superb accomplishment by a truly great artist" and "perhaps the most significant film ever produced." The film was also popular in the United Kingdom, drawing 9 million to the cinemas, despite Chaplin's fears that wartime audiences would dislike a comedy about a dictator. The film earned theater rentals of $3.5 million from the U.S. and Canada and $5 million in total worldwide rentals.

The film was banned in several Latin American countries, where there were active movements of Nazi sympathizers.

During the film's production, the British government had announced that it would prohibit its exhibition in the United Kingdom, in keeping with its appeasement policy concerning Nazi Germany, but by the time the film was released, the UK was at war with Germany and the film was welcomed in part for its obvious propaganda value. In 1941, London's Prince of Wales Theatre screened its UK premiere. The film had been banned in many parts of Europe, and the theatre's owner, Alfred Esdaile, was apparently fined for showing it.

When the film was released in France in 1945, it became the most popular film of the year, with admissions of 8,280,553. The film was voted at No. 24 on the list of "100 Greatest Films" by the prominent French magazine Cahiers du cinéma in 2008. In 2010, The Guardian considered it the 22nd-best comedy film of all time. The film was voted at No. 16 on the list of The 100 greatest comedies of all time by a poll of 253 film critics from 52 countries conducted by the BBC in 2017.

Chaplin biographer Jeffrey Vance concludes his lengthy examination of the film, in his book Chaplin: Genius of the Cinema, by asserting the film's importance among the great film satires. Vance writes, "Chaplin's The Great Dictator survives as a masterful integration of comedy, politics and satire. It stands as Chaplin's most self-consciously political work and the cinema's first important satire."

Vance further reports that a refugee from Germany who had worked in the film division of the Nazi Ministry of Culture before deciding to flee told Chaplin that Hitler had watched the movie twice, entirely alone both times. Chaplin replied that he would "... give anything to know what he thought of it."

Chaplin's Tramp character and the Jewish barber

There is no critical consensus on the relationship between Chaplin's earlier Tramp character and the film's Jewish barber, but the trend is to view the barber as a variation on the theme. French film director François Truffaut later noted that early in the production, Chaplin said he would not play The Tramp in a sound film. Turner Classic Movies says that years later, Chaplin acknowledged a connection between The Tramp and the barber. Specifically, "There is some debate as to whether the unnamed Jewish barber is intended as the Tramp's final incarnation. Although in his autobiography he refers to the barber as the Little Tramp, Chaplin said in 1937 that he would not play the Little Tramp in his sound pictures." In My Autobiography, Chaplin would write, "Of course! As Hitler I could harangue the crowds all I wished. And as the tramp, I could remain more or less silent." The New York Times, in its original review (16 October 1940), specifically sees him as the tramp. However, in the majority of his so-called tramp films, he was not literally playing a tramp. In his review of the film years after its release, Roger Ebert says, "Chaplin was technically not playing the Tramp." He also writes, "He [Chaplin] put the Little Tramp and $1.5 million of his own money on the line to ridicule Hitler."

Critics who view the barber as different include Stephen Weissman, whose book Chaplin: A Life speaks of Chaplin "abandoning traditional pantomime technique and his little tramp character". DVD reviewer Mark Bourne asserts Chaplin's stated position: "Granted, the barber bears more than a passing resemblance to the Tramp, even affecting the familiar bowler hat and cane. But Chaplin was clear that the barber is not the Tramp and The Great Dictator is not a Tramp movie." The Scarecrow Movie Guide also views the barber as different.

Annette Insdorf, in her book Indelible Shadows: Film and the Holocaust (2003), writes that "There was something curiously appropriate about the little tramp impersonating the dictator, for by 1939 Hitler and Chaplin were perhaps the two most famous men in the world. The tyrant and the tramp reverse roles in The Great Dictator, permitting the eternal outsider to address the masses". In The 50 Greatest Jewish Movies (1998), Kathryn Bernheimer writes, "What he chose to say in The Great Dictator, however, was just what one might expect from the Little Tramp. Film scholars have often noted that the Little Tramp resembles a Jewish stock figure, the ostracized outcast, an outsider."

Several reviewers of the late 20th century describe the Little Tramp as developing into the Jewish barber. In Boom and Bust: American Cinema in the 1940s, Thomas Schatz writes of "Chaplin's Little Tramp transposed into a meek Jewish barber", while, in Hollywood in Crisis: Cinema and American Society, 1929–1939, Colin Shindler writes, "The universal Little Tramp is transmuted into a specifically Jewish barber whose country is about to be absorbed into the totalitarian empire of Adenoid Hynkel." Finally, in A Distant Technology: Science Fiction Film and the Machine Age, J. P. Telotte writes that "The little tramp figure is here reincarnated as the Jewish barber".

A two-page discussion of the relationship between the barber and The Tramp appears in Eric L. Flom's book Chaplin in the Sound Era: An Analysis of the Seven Talkies. He concludes:

Awards
The film was nominated for five Academy Awards:
 Outstanding Production – United Artists (Charlie Chaplin, Producer)
 Best Actor – Charlie Chaplin
 Best Writing (Original Screenplay) – Charlie Chaplin
 Best Supporting Actor – Jack Oakie
 Best Music (Original Score) – Meredith Willson

Chaplin also won best actor awards at National Board of Review awards and New York Film Critics Circle Awards.

In 1997, The Great Dictator was selected by the Library of Congress for preservation in the United States National Film Registry as being "culturally, historically or aesthetically significant".

In 2000, the American Film Institute ranked the film No. 37 in its "100 Years... 100 Laughs" list.

The film holds a 92% "Fresh" rating on the review aggregator website Rotten Tomatoes based on 48 reviews, with an average rating of 8.90/10. The consensus reads, "Charlie Chaplin demonstrates that his comedic voice is undiminished by dialogue in this rousing satire of tyranny, which may be more distinguished by its uplifting humanism than its gags." Film critic Roger Ebert of Chicago Sun-Times gave the film four stars out of four and included it in his Great Movies list.

Plagiarism lawsuit
Chaplin's half-brother Sydney directed and starred in a 1921 film called King, Queen, Joker in which, like Chaplin, he played the dual role of a barber and ruler of a country which is about to be overthrown. More than twenty years later, in 1947, Charles Chaplin was sued over alleged plagiarism with The Great Dictator. Yet, apparently, neither the suing party nor Chaplin himself brought up his own brother's King, Queen, Joker of the silent era. The case, Bercovici v. Chaplin, was settled, with Chaplin paying Konrad Bercovici $95,000. Bercovici claimed that he had created ideas such as Chaplin playing a dictator and a dance with a globe, and that Chaplin had discussed his five-page outline for a screenplay with him for several hours. In return, Bercovici conceded that Chaplin was the sole author. Chaplin insisted in his autobiography that he had been the sole writer of the movie's script. He agreed to a settlement, because of his "unpopularity in the States at that moment and being under such court pressure, [he] was terrified, not knowing what to expect next."

Home media
A digitally restored version of the film was released on DVD and Blu-ray by the Criterion Collection in May 2011. The extras feature color production footage shot by Chaplin's half-brother Sydney, a deleted barbershop sequence from Chaplin's 1919 film Sunnyside, a barbershop sequence from Sydney Chaplin's 1921 film King, Queen, Joker, a visual essay by Chaplin biographer Jeffrey Vance titled "The Clown Turns Prophet", and The Tramp and the Dictator (2001), Kevin Brownlow and Michael Kloft's documentary exploring the lives of Chaplin and Hitler, including interviews with author Ray Bradbury, director Sidney Lumet, screenwriter Budd Schulberg, and others. It has a booklet featuring an essay by film critic Michael Wood, Chaplin's 1940 The New York Times defense of his movie, a reprint from critic Jean Narboni on the film's final speech, and Al Hirschfeld's original press book illustrations.

Marketing

Excerpts from Chaplin's speech were incorporated, as a voice-over, into a television advertisement (entitled "Good Morning Humanity") for the coffee company Lavazza.

Legacy
The Great Dictator influenced numerous directors, such as Stanley Kubrick, Mel Brooks, Wes Anderson, and Chuck Jones and inspired such films as The Dictator (2012), The Interview (2014), and Jojo Rabbit (2019).

The 2006 comedy Idiocracy pays minor homage to The Great Dictator when the main characters ride a time travel-themed attraction misspelled "The Time Masheen" presenting ridiculously inaccurate depictions of history, including one with "Charlie Chaplin and his evil Nazi regime".

Hynkel is mentioned in Alan Moore's The League of Extraordinary Gentlemen, Volume III: Century (2012), most significantly, in one of the prose short stories set in 1964. The spin-off graphic novel Nemo: The Roses of Berlin (2014) depicts Hynkel's regime and mentions an American comedian named "Addie Hitler" who mocks it.

Sean McArdle and Jon Judy's Eisner Award-nominated comic book The Führer and the Tramp is set during the production of The Great Dictator.

The 2000 album "Wat" by Slovenian music project Laibach features the track "" ("Dance with Laibach") which mentions Adenoid Hynkel, Benzino Napoloni and a direct hint on Hitler ("", the slightly altered name of his grandmother Maria Anna Schicklgruber) in the lyrics.

In the episode "El encuentro del siglo" of the comedy superhero TV show El Chapulín Colorado, the main character (played by Chespirito) fights Adolf Hitler (also played by Chespirito) in a manner inspired by "The Great Dictator".

In popular culture
Iron Sky, a 2014 song by Paolo Nutini, features an audio excerpt from the final speech in The Great Dictator.

U2 used a modified version of the movie's final speech as part of the intro sequence for their Experience + Innocence Tour in European venues in 2018.

During their 2016–2017 A Head Full of Dreams Tour, Coldplay used the final speech as the opening to their shows. Blended with electronic sounds played behind the speech, Coldplay made use of the speech to echo their own message of the tour, which included spreading hope and love throughout the world.

Mos Def sampled the final speech in his song War.

See also
 Hitler's Reign of Terror (screened 30 April 1934), possibly the first American anti-Nazi film
 Are We Civilized? (released 6 June 1934), about an unspecified dictatorship
 To Be or Not to Be (February 15, 1942), a dark comedy about living in Nazi-occupied Warsaw (also remade in 1983 by Mel Brooks)

References

Sources
 Chaplin and American Culture: The Evolution of a Star Image. Charles J. Maland. Princeton, 1989.
 National Film Theatre/British Film Institute notes on The Great Dictator.
 The Tramp and the Dictator, directed by Kevin Brownlow, Michael Kloft 2002, 88 mn.

External links

 The Great Dictator essay on the National Film Registry website 
 The Great Dictator essay by Daniel Eagan in America's Film Legacy: The Authoritative Guide to the Landmark Movies in the National Film Registry, A&C Black, 2010 , pages 320-321 America's Film Legacy: The Authoritative Guide to the Landmark Movies in the National Film Registry
 
 
 
 
 
 The Great Dictator: The Joker and the Madman an essay by Michael Wood at the Criterion Collection
 "The Great Dictator (1940) The Screen in Review", Bosley Crowther Wallace, The New York Times, October 16, 1940

1940 films
1940s war comedy-drama films
American black-and-white films
American war comedy-drama films
American satirical films
American political comedy-drama films
American political satire films
Anti-fascist propaganda films
Anti-war films about World War II
Articles containing video clips
Cultural depictions of Adolf Hitler
Cultural depictions of Benito Mussolini
Esperanto-language films
Films about fascists
Films directed by Charlie Chaplin
Films set in 1918
Films set in Europe
Films set in a fictional country
Films shot in California
Films shot in Los Angeles
Military humor in film
Films involved in plagiarism controversies
United States National Film Registry films
Fictional dictators
Films à clef
Western Front (World War I) films
1940s English-language films
1940s American films
Films about lookalikes